St John's Anglican Church, also known as St John the Evangelist Anglican Church, is a heritage-listed Anglican church on York  Street in , Western Australia. The church is the oldest consecrated church in Western Australia, consecrated in October 1848.

History

The church was built by the people of the town, with construction commencing in 1841 and completed in 1844. The church was consecrated on 25 October 1848 by Bishop Augustus Short of Adelaide who introduced John Ramsden Wollaston as its clergyman. At this time the church would have been able to accommodate the entire population of the town, 170 people. 

Construction of the rectory commenced in 1850 and was completed the same year. Originally it was a single story stone building, however a second storey was added in 1875. A second rectory was built behind the original one in 1980.

The first recorded Anzac dawn service was held by the church in 1930.

The church, rectory, hall and peppermint trees were listed on the register of the National Trust in 1978.

From 1968 to 1979 Warwick Bastian was the coadjutor bishop of Bunbury, with the title Bishop of Albany. During that time, he based himself at St John's. 

Canon Edward Argyl was appointed as the parish priest in 2011 until his death in 2015.

Description
The church is a stone building with gabled roofs covered in shingles. The walls are so thick that no buttresses are required. The original building is now the nave of the present church, with the gallery behind built in 1852. The tower and porch were completed in 1853. The tower is topped with battlements on the parapet.

See also
 List of Anglican churches in Western Australia
 List of places on the State Register of Heritage Places in the City of Albany

References

Notes

Bibliography

External links

Albany
Churches in Albany, Western Australia
Heritage places in Albany, Western Australia
State Register of Heritage Places in the City of Albany
Stone churches in Australia
Victorian architecture in Western Australia
Western Australian places listed on the defunct Register of the National Estate
York Street, Albany, Western Australia
19th-century Anglican church buildings
19th-century churches in Australia
1841 establishments in Australia
Churches completed in 1844